Sunbury was a federal electoral district in New Brunswick, Canada, that was represented in the House of Commons of Canada from 1867 to 1904.

It was created by the British North America Act of 1867, and abolished in 1892 when it was merged into Sunbury—Queen's riding.

Members of Parliament

This riding elected the following Members of Parliament:

Election results

See also 

 List of Canadian federal electoral districts
 Past Canadian electoral districts

External links 
 Riding history from the Library of Parliament

Former federal electoral districts of New Brunswick